Federico Bisson (born 23 January 1936) is a former Italian triple jumper who competed at the 1960 Summer Olympics.

References

External links
 

1936 births
Living people
Athletes (track and field) at the 1960 Summer Olympics
Italian male triple jumpers
Olympic athletes of Italy